Ekinli can refer to:

 Ekinli, Bitlis
 Ekinli, Karacabey